Spencer Locke (born September 20, 1991) is an American actress known for her roles as Kylie in Cougar Town, Jenny Bennett in Monster House, Ione in Detention, and K-Mart in the Resident Evil film series.

Life and career
Prior to her recurring role as Candida Keegel in Phil of the Future in 2005, Locke had a recurring role as Bitsy Johnson on season one of the Nickelodeon series Ned's Declassified School Survival Guide. Locke has also guest starred as Brandee Case in the Without a Trace season two episode "Wannabe," Kayla in the That's So Raven season four episode "Mad Hot Cotillion" and Jenny Bennett in the animated film Monster House. She appeared in the 2007 film Resident Evil: Extinction as K-Mart, a girl found in the ruins of a K-Mart by Claire Redfield's companions prior to the outbreak. Locke reprised her role as K-Mart in the film Resident Evil: Afterlife in 2010 and appeared as Amber Bradley in The Vampire Diaries episode "Miss Mystic Falls." Locke had a recurring role in the ABC primetime comedy Cougar Town as Kylie, the girlfriend who Travis Cobb loses his virginity to. She appeared regularly in season one and briefly during season two. On-screen, the pair separated when Travis moved to college while Kylie was still in high school. Locke made her last appearance as Kylie in a brief scene in the season two episode Little Girl Blues when Travis introduces his new girlfriend Kirsten (Collette Wolfe) to the family. Locke is the voice of Wisty Allgood in the audiobooks of the Witch and Wizard series by author James Patterson. She was also the voice of Ashley in Forza Horizon 2 for Xbox. She also played one of the Jennifers on Big Time Rush.

Personal life
She married Chris Mason in 2017. In July 2020, they had a daughter named Monroe and a son in November 2022.

Filmography

Film

Television

Video games

References

External links

 
 

1991 births
Actresses from Florida
American child actresses
American film actresses
American television actresses
Living people
People from Winter Park, Florida
21st-century American actresses